Mordellistena loasea is a beetle in the genus Mordellistena of the family Mordellidae. It was described in 1855 by Germain.

References

loasea
Beetles described in 1855